Elizabeth Brudenell, Countess of Cardigan may refer to:
 Elizabeth Brudenell, Countess of Cardigan (1689–1745)
 Elizabeth Brudenell, Countess of Cardigan (1758–1823)